Verin Jrashen, is a neighbourhood in the Erebuni District of the Armenian capital Yerevan. It is very close by Argishti.

References 

Populated places in Yerevan